Lawrence Douglas Hill (July 29, 1950 – November 22, 2021) was an American meteorologist.  He was the chief meteorologist for ABC 7 News/WJLA-TV in Washington, D.C. at noon, 4, 5, and 6. He has been awarded the "Seal of Approval" from the American Meteorological Society. Hill has also been honored with a Washington Emmy Award for broadcast excellence. Hill has also served as a meteorologist for affiliates in Richmond, Virginia; Washington D.C.; and Detroit.

Hill graduated from Towson State College. He enlisted in the United States Air Force, serving for four years mostly at Andrews Air Force Base. After leaving the military, he served as a police officer for Prince George's County for six years.

Hill began his meteorology career in Richmond, Virginia, where he got his first break at WWBT-TV as the weekend weatherman. He then moved on to Detroit for the next four and a half years until returning east to Washington, D.C. with CBS affiliate WUSA in 1984. He stayed at WUSA for 16 years until moving to WJLA.

He retired from WJLA-TV on September 15, 2017. He was a radio personality on WGTS 91.9 FM, a Christian radio station. He stated that he wanted to use his platform as a well-known figure in the Washington area for Christian ministry.

Hill died on November 22, 2021, at the age of 71. He was married twice, latterly to Mary Ann Vranken, and had four children, one of which predeceased him.

References

External links
Biography Page on WJLA-TV website

1950 births
2021 deaths
People from Calvert County, Maryland
Towson University alumni
United States Air Force airmen
Television anchors from Washington, D.C.
Television meteorologists in Washington, D.C.